Mister Wonderful is a graphic novel by American cartoonist Daniel Clowes, published in 2011 by Pantheon Books after first being serialized in The New York Times Magazine.  Its main protagonists are Marshall (a self-disparaging, middle-aged loner) and Natalie, who are brought together on a blind date.  Marshall finds his date far too attractive to be interested in him and concludes there must be something wrong with her when she does not show signs of wanting to leave.  Marshall's self-deprecating, paranoid introspections so overwhelm him that his own thought balloons sometimes cover up Natalie's dialogue.

The book is published in an unusual format, wider than it is long.  This allows for an extremely wide two-page spread at the conclusion.  The book was expanded and the pages were reformatted from their original twenty-instalment appearance in The New York Times Magazine in 2007 and 2008.

References

Works cited

External links
Index of the Mister Wonderful serialization at The New York Times online

2011 graphic novels
Drama comics
Romance comics
Comics by Daniel Clowes
Pantheon Books graphic novels
Comics characters introduced in 2011
2011 comics debuts
2011 comics endings
Male characters in comics
Novels first published in serial form